Vladimir Yuryevich Osokin (born 8 January 1954) is a retired Soviet cyclist. He won a silver and a gold medal in the 4000 m team pursuit at the 1976 and 1980 Summer Olympics, respectively; individually, he finished in fourth and fifth place. Between 1975 and 1981 he won five silver medals in the individual and team pursuit at the world championships. 

As a road racer, he finished second in the multistage Peace Race individually and first in the team competition in 1977. 

Osokin has a degree in engineering from the Kirov Leningrad Institute of Textile and Light Industry (now St. Petersburg State University of Technology and Design).

References 

1954 births
Living people
Cyclists at the 1976 Summer Olympics
Cyclists at the 1980 Summer Olympics
Olympic cyclists of the Soviet Union
Olympic gold medalists for the Soviet Union
Olympic silver medalists for the Soviet Union
Soviet male cyclists
Olympic medalists in cycling
Medalists at the 1976 Summer Olympics
Medalists at the 1980 Summer Olympics
Russian track cyclists
Cyclists from Saint Petersburg